Brian Brinkley  (born 28 December 1953) is an English former competitive swimmer who represented Great Britain in the Olympic Games, FINA world championships and European championships, and England in the Commonwealth Games, during the 1970s.  During his elite swimming career, he won thirteen medals in major international swimming championships.

Swimming career
At the 1972 Summer Olympics in Munich, West Germany, Brinkley qualified to compete in six events: the 100-, 200-, 400- and 1500-metre freestyle events, the 200-metre butterfly, and the 4x200-metre freestyle relay.  His best performances were fourth in the 400-metre freestyle final, and eighth as a member of the British men's team in the 4x200-metre freestyle relay.

Brinkley was a member of the British national team at the 1974 European Aquatics Championships in Vienna, winning a pair of silver medals in the men's 200-metre butterfly and as a member of the British team in the 4x100-metre medley relay.

When Christchurch, New Zealand hosted the 1974 British Commonwealth Games, he swam for England in six events, winning medals in all of them.  He won a gold medal for his first-place performance in the 200-metre butterfly, and two silver medals for finishing second in the 200-metre and 400-metre individual medley events.  He was also a member of all three of England's relay teams, winning a silver in the 4x200-metre freestyle, and bronzes in the 4x100-metre freestyle and 4x100-metre medley.

At the 1975 World Aquatics Championships, he won a silver medal with the British men in the 4x200-metre freestyle relay, and three bronze medals in the 200-metre freestyle, 200-metre butterfly, and 4x100-metre medley relay.  He was appointed MBE in the 1976 New Year Honours.

A year later in Montreal, Quebec, at the 1976 Summer Olympics, Brinkley competed in four events.  He was a member of the fourth-place British team in the men's 4x100-metre medley relay, and won a bronze medal with the third-place British men in the 4x200-metre freestyle relay.  In individual competition, he advanced to the event final of the 200-metre butterfly and came sixth.  He also swam in the preliminary heats of the 200-metre freestyle but did not advance.

He won the 1974 ASA National Championship 100 metres freestyle title, was a five times winner of the 200 metres freestyle (1971-1975) and a four times winner of the 400 metres freestyle in (1971-1974). He also won the 1972 ASA British National 1500 metres freestyle title  and the 200 metres butterfly title in 1972, 1973 and 1974.

Coaching
Later, while coaching at Peterborough (his home town), he coached channel swimmers and was in a successful relay channel team in 1987

See also
 List of Commonwealth Games medallists in swimming (men)
 List of European Aquatics Championships medalists in swimming (men)
 List of Olympic medalists in swimming (men)
 List of World Aquatics Championships medalists in swimming (men)

References

1953 births
Living people
Sportspeople from Peterborough
English male swimmers
European Aquatics Championships medalists in swimming
Male butterfly swimmers
English male freestyle swimmers
Olympic bronze medallists for Great Britain
Olympic bronze medalists in swimming
Olympic swimmers of Great Britain
Swimmers at the 1972 Summer Olympics
Swimmers at the 1976 Summer Olympics
World Aquatics Championships medalists in swimming
Swimmers at the 1974 British Commonwealth Games
Medalists at the 1976 Summer Olympics
Commonwealth Games medallists in swimming
Commonwealth Games silver medallists for England
Commonwealth Games bronze medallists for England
Members of the Order of the British Empire
Medallists at the 1974 British Commonwealth Games